Pomacentrus similis, commonly known as the similar damsel, is a fish native to  Sri Lanka and the Andaman Sea in the Indian Ocean.

References

similis
Fish of Sri Lanka
Fish of Thailand
Fish described in 1991
Taxa named by Gerald R. Allen